Ihor Melnyk (born 5 March 1983) is a Ukrainian football forward who plays for FC Sumy.

Career 
Melnyk started his career with Torpedo Mykolaiv before moving to Kharkiv with first Metalist Kharkiv and then a short spell at Helios Kharkiv. Melnyk then played for both Ihroservice Simferopol and Illichivets Mariupol before moving to Azerbaijan with Gabala on a one-year contract. In his only Season with Gabala, Melnyk scored 6 goals in 27 league games, finishing second in the club's goal scoring charts behind Tomasz Stolpa. Melnyk returned to the Ukraine at the start of the 2011–12 season,  signing with FC Sumy and helping them to promotion to the Ukrainian First League, as well as the league title, the same season.

Career statistics

Honours

Team 
FC Sumy
 Ukrainian Second League: (1) 2011–12

References

External links
 
 

Ukrainian footballers
Ukrainian footballers banned from domestic competitions
Ukrainian expatriate footballers
Expatriate footballers in Azerbaijan
Ukrainian expatriate sportspeople in Azerbaijan
1983 births
Living people
Sportspeople from Mykolaiv
Association football forwards
Gabala FC players
FC Torpedo Mykolaiv players
FC Metalist Kharkiv players
FC Helios Kharkiv players
FC Ihroservice Simferopol players
FC Mariupol players
FC Hvardiyets Hvardiiske players
PFC Sumy players
FC Bakhchisaray players
FC Krymteplytsia Molodizhne players
FC TSK Simferopol players